Lincolnshire Posy is a musical composition by Percy Grainger for concert band commissioned in 1937 by the American Bandmasters Association. Considered by John Bird, the author of Grainger's biography, to be his masterpiece, the  work has six movements, each adapted from folk songs that Grainger had collected on a 1905–1906 trip to Lincolnshire, England. In a similar fashion to these folk songs, many of the movements are in strophic form. The work debuted with three movements on March 7, 1937 performed by the Milwaukee Symphonic Band, a group composed of members from bands including the Blatz Brewery and Pabst Blue Ribbon beer factory worker bands in Milwaukee, Wisconsin.

Unlike other composers who attempted to alter and modernize folk music, such as Ralph Vaughan Williams, Grainger wished to maintain the exact stylizing that he experienced from the originals. In the piece's program notes, Grainger wrote: "...Each number is intended to be a kind of musical portrait of the singer who sang its underlying melody—a musical portrait of the singer’s personality no less than of his habits of song—his regular or irregular interpretation of the rhythm, his preference for gaunt or ornately arabesqued delivery, his contrasts of legato and staccato, his tendency towards breadth or delicacy of tone."

Grainger dedicated his "bunch of Wildflowers" to "the old folksingers who sang so sweetly to me".

Instrumentation
The suite is scored for the following band:

Woodwinds
Piccolo
2 Flutes
2 Oboes
Cor anglais
2 Bassoons
Contrabassoon
Clarinet in E
 3 Clarinets in B
Alto clarinet in E
Bass clarinet in B
Soprano saxophone
2 Alto saxophones
Tenor saxophone
Baritone saxophone
Bass saxophone

Brass 
 3 Trumpets
 4 Horns in F
 2 Tenor trombones
Bass trombone
Baritone
Euphonium
Tuba

Strings 
String bass

Percussion 
Timpani
Xylophone
Glockenspiel
Handbells
Tubular bells
Snare drum
Bass drum
Cymbals

Movements

I. "Lisbon"
Originally entitled "Dublin Bay", the first movement is the shortest—a simple, lilting melody in  time. The melody follows a young sailor preparing to leave his love to head towards Lisbon. In the opening of the movement, the main theme is stated by the 1st and 2nd trumpets (with mutes), 1st horns, and bassoon. As is typical with any piece of music in strophic form such as this, the theme is repeated throughout by the other sections of the ensemble. Later in the movement, the 1st horns and trumpets quote another Grainger work, entitled "The Duke of Marlborough Fanfare" as the rest of the ensemble continues with a repetition of the theme. The final repetition augments the theme and ends with a 2-3 retardation.

II. "Horkstow Grange"
Also in strophic form, the theme is stated by the clarinets and horns at the opening of the movement.

III. "Rufford Park Poachers"
Based on the ballad of the same name which Grainger had learned from folk singer Joseph Taylor, the movement presents an asymmetrical melody between B clarinet and piccolo echoed by the E clarinet and bass clarinet. In an alternate version that Grainger wrote, the melody originates in the piccolo and alto clarinet and is echoed by the oboe and bassoon in a similar fashion.

This movement is considered quite difficult to count due to the counterpoint, unusual rhythms, and rapidly shifting time signatures. As mentioned, Grainger wrote two versions; one with a flugelhorn solo and one with a soprano saxophone solo. It is noted that Grainger preferred the latter, but only if the soloist was able to perform the solo with much expression and musicality. Therefore, most ensembles who record the work in its entirety choose this version in order to stay true to the composer’s wishes.

The ensemble Grainger had chosen to premiere the piece, the Milwaukee Symphonic Band, was unable to play this movement, which led to its being omitted from the premiere performance, along with the fifth movement.

IV. "The Brisk Young Sailor"
A simple, short, jaunty tune in the key of B major meant to evoke the image of a strapping young lad striding up the road to meet his sweetheart. The movement, also in strophic form, opens with the clarinet section stating the theme. The theme is then elaborated upon by the entire ensemble with several variations.

A notable part of this movement is a baritone horn solo, which is accompanied by the first clarinets, E clarinet, flutes, and piccolo with virtuosic sextuplet patterns and arpeggios. This accompaniment is a technical challenge regarded by many as the reason for this movement is among the most difficult of the six movements to perform.

V. "Lord Melbourne"
A fierce war song originally entitled "Lord Marlborough," the title refers to John Churchill, 1st Duke of Marlborough. It opens in free time, in which the conductor gives gestures for every beat. The piece then moves into a trumpet solo followed by a repetition of the opening, also in free time.

Like the third movement, this movement was omitted at the work’s premiere.

VI. "The Lost Lady Found"
A lilting,  melody in strophic form. As the tempo is too fast for the conductor to gesture each beat of every measure, the movement is typically conducted "in 1" where each gesture given by the conductor indicates a full measure instead of each beat. Also in strophic form, almost every section of the ensemble states the theme at some point in the movement.

This movement is based on the ballad of the same name, in which a lady, who while living with her uncle in a village is kidnapped by three Roma. After being missing for a long time, the villagers begin to speculate that the uncle is responsible for her disappearance, later imprisoning him and condemning him to death. At some point, the lady was found in Dublin by a young squire who loved her and was subsequently brought back to the village. Upon return to the village, the villagers, mere moments away from executing the uncle at the gallows, realized their error and set the uncle free, celebrating the lady's return with church bells (which are emulated by the tubular bells in the closing of the movement), music, and frivolity.

As this movement was not yet completed at the time of the work's premiere, it was omitted for the performance.

References

Citations

Bibliography

External links

Audio 

 Performance by the United States Navy Band conducted by Frederick Fennell

 Original field recordings made by Percy Grainger

Compositions by Percy Grainger
Concert band pieces
Suites (music)
Culture in Lincolnshire
1937 compositions
Compositions using folk songs